The Mansfield Shire is a local government area in the Hume region of Victoria, Australia, located in the north-east part of the state.

It includes the towns of Mansfield, Maindample, Mount Buller, Bonnie Doon, Jamieson, Kevington, Merrijig, Tolmie and Woods Point. It was formed in 2002 from the de-amalgamation of the Shire of Delatite into the current shire and the Rural City of Benalla.

The de-amalgamation was the only successful de-amalgamation following the Kennett Government's policy of local government mergers. It was the result of organised political activity, with parallels to other autonomy movements.

The Shire is governed and administered by Mansfield Shire Council; its seat of local government and administrative centre is located at the council headquarters in Mansfield. The Shire is named after the main urban settlement located in the north of the LGA, that is Mansfield, which is also the LGA's most populous urban centre with a population of 4,360.

The Shire is bordered by the Rural City of Benalla, the Shire of Baw Baw, the Shire of Murrindindi, the Shire of Yarra Ranges, the Shire of Strathbogie and the Shire of Wellington. There are two unincorporated areas within the shire; the areas around Mount Buller and Mount Stirling.

Council

Current composition
The Shire has an unsubdivided structure, with five councillors elected to represent the community across the shire.

Administration and governance
The council meets in the council chambers at the council headquarters in the Mansfield Municipal Offices, which is also the location of the council's administrative activities. It also provides customer services at its administrative centre in Mansfield.

Townships and localities
The 2021 census, the shire had a population of 10,178 up from 8,584 in the 2016 census

^ - Territory divided with another LGA
* - Not noted in 2016 Census

See also
 List of localities (Victoria)
 List of places on the Victorian Heritage Register in the Shire of Mansfield

References

External links

Mansfield Shire Council official website
Metlink local public transport map 
Link to Land Victoria interactive maps

Local government areas of Victoria (Australia)
Hume (region)